Dani Lual Gumnok Thon (born 29 November 2002) is a South Sudanese footballer who plays as a forward for MFK Vyškov and the South Sudan national team.

Club career

Lula started his career with Atlabara. In 2019, he signed for Kenyan side Mathare United.
After that, Lual trialed for Valencia C in Spain.

In 2021, he came to the Czech Republic, more precisely to the second league in Vyškov. Besides playing for their first team, he also played for their youth team. In 2022, he was sent on loan to Blansko.

International career
Lual made his debut for his national team in October 2021. He made his first appearance against Sierra Leone.

Career statistics

Club

International
Statistics accurate as of match played 12 October 2021.

International goalsScores and results list South Sudan's goal tally first, score column indicates score after each Lual goal.''

References

2002 births
Living people
South Sudanese footballers
Association football forwards
Mathare United F.C. players
Czech National Football League players
MFK Vyškov players
FK Blansko players
South Sudanese expatriate footballers
Expatriate footballers in Kenya
Expatriate footballers in the Czech Republic